Events in the year 1915 in Norway.

Incumbents
Monarch – Haakon VII

Events
 20 May - The Bastøy Boys' Home Insurrection.
 21 October - The 1915 Parliamentary election takes place.
 The present Lindesnes Lighthouse was built.

Popular culture

Sports

Music

Film

Literature
 The Knut Hamsund novel Segelfoss By Volume 1 & 2 (Segelfoss Town), was published.
 The Olav Duun novel Harald was published.

Notable births

16 January – Aase Bjerkholt, politician (died 2012)
19 January – Håkon Kyllingmark, politician and minister (died 2003)
25 January – Sverre L. Mo, politician (died 2002)
31 January – Andreas Zeier Cappelen, politician (died 2008).
3 February – Henki Kolstad, actor (died 2008).
14 February – Idar Norstrand, civil servant and politician (died 1986)
8 March – Odd Hilt, sculptor (died 1986).
9 March – Kåre Grøndahl Hagem, politician (died 2008)
13 March – Eva Scheer, journalist, literary critic, translator and author (died 1999).
22 March – Erling Asbjørn Kongshaug, rifle shooter, Olympic gold medallist and multiple World Champion (died 1993)
28 March – Odd Vigestad, politician (died 1999)
31 March – Bergfrid Fjose, politician and minister (died 2004)
21 April – Oddmund Myklebust, politician and minister (died 1972)
8 May – Arvid Fladmoe, composer and conductor (died 1993)
10 May – Kristian Lien, politician (died 1996)
12 May – Olav Askvik, politician (died 2011)
15 May – Jens Christian Hauge, resistance member and politician (died 2006)
5 June – John Engh, architect (died 1996)
5 June – Hilmar Myhra, ski jumper (died 2013)
8 June – Knut Haus, politician (died 2006)
23 June – Jens Bolling, actor and theatre director (died 1992)
1 July – Rolf Hauge, army officer (died 1989)
2 July – Georg Krog, speed skater and Olympic silver medallist (died 1991)
9 July – Arvid Storsveen, intelligence officer (died 1943)
23 July – Olai Ingemar Eikeland, politician (died 2003)
15 August – Per Sonerud, politician (died 1993)
16 August – Odd Lien, newspaper editor and politician (died 2002)
19 August – Erling Kaas, pole vaulter (died 1996)
29 August – Einar Tufte-Johnsen, aviation officer (d. 1985).
3 September – Knut Nystedt, composer (died 2014)
24 September – Knut Schmidt-Nielsen, comparative physiologist (died 2007)
30 September – Wilhelm Bøe, organizational leader (died 1980).
17 October – Alfred Hauge, novelist, poet and historian (died 1986)
22 October – Per Karstensen, politician (died 2010)
6 November – Olav Berkaak, novelist (died 1980).
11 November – Carl Fredrik Engelstad, writer, playwright, journalist, translator and theatre director (died 1996)
29 November – Erik Stai, high jumper (died 2004)
9 December – Arnt Eliassen, meteorologist (died 2000)
13 December – Magne Skodvin, historian (died 2004)
15 December – Odd Aukrust, economist (died 2008).
31 December – Olaf Knudson, politician (died 1996)

Full date missing
Alf-Jørgen Aas, painter (died 1981)
Astrid Hjertenæs Andersen, poet and travel writer (died 1985)
Johan Hambro, journalist (died 1993)
Rein Henriksen, lawyer and industrialist (died 1994)
Johan Berthin Holte, businessperson (died 2002)
Agnar Mykle, author (died 1994)
Rasmus Nordbø, politician and minister (died 1983)

Notable deaths
29 January – Ole Andres Olsen, Seventh-day Adventist minister and administrator (born 1845)
15 April – Christian Andreas Irgens, politician (born 1833)
28 April – Vilhelmine Ullmann, proponent for women's rights (born 1816)
28 July – Christopher Knudsen, priest, politician and minister (born 1843)
12 August – Haakon Ditlev Lowzow, military officer, politician and minister (born 1854)

Full date unknown
Lars Holst, journalist, newspaper editor and politician (born 1848)
Knud Knudsen, photographer (born 1832)
Henrik Nissen, architect (born 1848)
Christian Wilhelm Engel Bredal Olssøn, politician and minister (born 1844)
Karl Ditlev Rygh, archaeologist and politician (born 1839)

See also

References

External links

Norway
Norway